Uallach ingen Muinechain (died 934) was an Irish poet and Chief Ollam of Ireland.

Uallach was of the Corca Dhuibhne of County Kerry, described as a banfhile Herend/woman-poet of Ireland in her obituary in the Annals of Innisfallen. Women poets are notable by their near-total absence from Gaelic sources, and nothing is known of Uallach or her work.

Citations

References
 Uallach ingen Muinechain, Maire Ni Dhonnchadha, in The Encyclopaedia of Ireland, p. 1087, Dublin, 2003.

External links
Annals of the Four Masters

Year of birth unknown
934 deaths
Medieval Irish poets
Irish women poets
10th-century Irish poets
People from County Kerry
10th-century Irish women writers
Irish-language writers